Eugene Doherty (22 January 1862 – 1 May 1937) was an Irish Cumann na nGaedheal politician.  A Civil servant before entering politics, he was first elected to Dáil Éireann as a Cumann na nGaedheal Teachta Dála (TD) for the Donegal constituency at the 1923 general election. He was re-elected at each subsequent election until lost his seat at the 1933 general election.

References

1862 births
1937 deaths
Cumann na nGaedheal TDs
Members of the 4th Dáil
Members of the 5th Dáil
Members of the 6th Dáil
Members of the 7th Dáil
Politicians from County Donegal